The Valley of the Giants is a 1927 silent film adventure directed by Charles Brabin and starring Milton Sills and Doris Kenyon who were real-life man and wife. It was based on a novel by Peter B. Kyne.  First National produced and distributed the film having gained the screen rights to the story from Famous Players-Lasky and Paramount. Paramount had made a version of the novel in 1919 with Wallace Reid, and it would again be filmed in 1938. A copy of this film survives at the UCLA Film and Television Archive. It is also listed as existing in an incomplete print at the Library of Congress. A 16mm copy is housed at the Wisconsin Center for Film & Theater Research.

Cast
Milton Sills as Bryce Cardigan
Doris Kenyon as Shirley Pennington
Arthur Stone as Buck Ogilvy
George Fawcett as John Cardigan
Paul Hurst as Randeau
Charles Sellon as Pennington
Yola d'Avril as Felice
Phil Brady as Big Boy
James A. Marcus as Mayor
Erville Alderson as Councilman
Dan Crimmins as Councilman
Otto Hoffman as Councilman
Lucien Littlefield as Councilman
Dan Mason as Councilman

Production
The film was shot on location in Humboldt County, California.

References

External links

1927 films
1920s adventure drama films
American silent feature films
American black-and-white films
Films based on American novels
Films directed by Charles Brabin
First National Pictures films
Remakes of American films
Films set in forests
Films about lumberjacks
American adventure drama films
1927 drama films
1920s American films
Silent American drama films
Silent adventure drama films
1920s English-language films